Leipsic is a town in Kent County, Delaware, United States. It is part of the Dover, Delaware Metropolitan Statistical Area. The population was 183 at the 2010 census.

History
A post office called Leipsic was established in 1839, and remained in operation until 1902. The name is a variation of Leipzig, one of the largest cities in eastern Germany.

Geography

The Leipsic River flows through the town on the southern edge of the Bombay Hook National Wildlife Refuge.

Infrastructure

Transportation

Delaware Route 9, a scenic route running near the Delaware Bay, passes north–south through Leipsic along Denny Street, heading north toward the Bombay Hook National Wildlife Refuge and south toward Little Creek. Delaware Route 42 begins at DE 9 in Leipsic and heads west along Fast Landing Road toward Cheswold and an intersection with U.S. Route 13. Smyrna-Leipsic Road splits northwest from DE 9 north of Leipsic and heads toward Smyrna. Leipsic Road begins at DE 9 south of Leipsic and heads southwest toward Dover.

Utilities
Delmarva Power, a subsidiary of Exelon, provides electricity to Leipsic. Chesapeake Utilities provides natural gas to the town.

Education
Portions south of the Leipsic River are in the Capital School District. Portions north of the river are in the Smyrna School District.

Dover High School is the comprehensive high school of the Capital school district. Smyrna High School is the comprehensive high school of the Smyrna school district.

Demographics

As of the census of 2000, there were 203 people, 79 households, and 48 families residing in the town. The racial makeup of the town was 93.10% White, 1.97% Native American, 0.99% Asian, 0.49% from other races, and 3.45% from two or more races. Hispanic or Latino of any race were 2.46% of the population.

There were 79 households, out of which 31.6% had children under the age of 18 living with them, 41.8% were married couples living together, 10.1% had a female householder with no husband present, and 39.2% were non-families. 26.6% of all households were made up of individuals, and 7.6% had someone living alone who was 65 years of age or older.  The average household size was 2.57 and the average family size was 3.21.

In the town the age demographic was as follows:  29.1% of the residents were under the age of 18, 8.4% ranged in age from 18 to 24, 26.1% from 25 to 44, 25.1% from 45 to 64, and 11.3% were 65 years of age or older.  The median age was 36 years. For every 100 females there were 82.9 males.  For every 100 females age 18 and over, there were 92.0 males.

The median income for a household in the town was $37,656, and the median income for a family was $39,219. Males had a median income of $35,156 versus $22,500 for females. The per capita income for the town was $13,825.  About 10.2% of families and 14.9% of the population were below the poverty line, including 20.0% of those under the age of eighteen and none of those sixty-five or over.

Notable person 
William Jackson Palmer, Civil War general and railroad developer

References

External links

 
Towns in Kent County, Delaware
Towns in Delaware